CCGS John P. Tully is an offshore oceanographic science vessel in the Canadian Coast Guard operating out of Pacific Region at CGS Base Patricia Bay in Sidney, British Columbia. Prior to 1995, the ship was assigned to Fisheries and Oceans Canada. The vessel entered service in June 1985 with the Department of Fisheries and Oceans on the West Coast of Canada. In 1995, the fleets of Fisheries and Oceans and the Canadian Coast Guard were merged under Canadian Coast Guard command and John P. Tully became a Coast Guard vessel.

Design and description
The ship has two Deutz 628 geared diesel engines powering three Caterpillar C18 generators driving one controllable-pitch propeller and stern and bow thrusters creating .

The research vessel is equipped with Sperry Bridgemaster navigational radar operating on the X and S-bands. John P. Tully has a  flight deck situated between the bow and the forward superstructure. The ship can operate one light helicopter of the MBB Bo 105 or Bell 206L types from the flight deck but is not equipped with a hangar for storage. The ship has a complement of 21, comprising 7 officers and 14 crew. There are also 20 spare berths aboard the vessel.

Operational history

John P. Tully was constructed by Bel-Air Shipyard in Vancouver, British Columbia with the yard number 302 and was launched in December 1984. The ship was completed and entered service with the Department of Fisheries and Oceans in June 1985. In 1995 the fleets of Fisheries and Oceans and the Canadian Coast Guard were merged under Canadian Coast Guard command and John P. Tully was given the prefix CCGS. The research vessel was named for the oceanographer John P. Tully and is based at the Institute of Ocean Sciences at Sidney, British Columbia.

John P. Tully has been employed on joint research voyages with a variety of United States agencies, including the National Oceanic and Atmospheric Administration. Due to a violent storm with winds reaching , the Coast Guard vessel could not reach the site until the next morning. John P. Tully recovered two survivors from the four crew.

See also
 List of equipment of the Canadian Coast Guard

References

Notes

Citations

Sources
 
 
 

1984 ships
Ships of the Canadian Coast Guard
Research vessels of Canada
Ships built in British Columbia